Kopaniec  is a village in the administrative district of Gmina Stara Kamienica, within Jelenia Góra County, Lower Silesian Voivodeship, in south-western Poland.

Kopaniec is situated in the foothills of the Jizera Mountains (Góry Izerskie) near the Karkonosze. The village is well known because the artist colony (see www.kopaniec.pl). There are many agro-tourist facilities.

References

Kopaniec